Villar de Argañán is a municipality located in the province of Salamanca, Castile and León, Spain. In 2016 the municipality had a population of 89 inhabitants. Located 105 km from Salamanca, it was known as Villar del Puerco until the 1950s.

References

Municipalities in the Province of Salamanca